The Amazing Race 1 (originally broadcast under the name The Amazing Race) is the first season of the American reality television series, The Amazing Race. It debuted on September 5, 2001, on CBS and ended its run on December 13, 2001. It featured eleven teams of two as they competed in a race around the world.

Lawyers and best friends Rob Frisbee and Brennan Swain were the winners, while separated parents Frank and Margarita Mesa finished in second place, and life partners Joe Baldassare and Bill Bartek finished in third.

Production

In December 2000, CBS announced that it was set to produce a new reality show entitled CBS Summer Global Adventure Series, which would feature eight teams of two traveling to eleven international locations to win US$1 million. Location scouting for the race course took place in January 2001. The first season of The Amazing Race traveled  in 39 days, spanning four continents and nine countries. The season was hit with multiple filming delays, including an airport strike in Rome and a sandstorm in Tunisia, the latter of which forced teams to begin Leg 6 in Gabès rather than the original Saharan desert pit stop. The top of the World Trade Center was considered as the finish location for the season but was changed to Flushing Meadows Park after production was unable to secure needed permits.

Multiple aspects of filming were unique to the first season of the series. Host Phil Keoghan handed out clues at the beginning of some legs and only greeted the last-place team at each pit stop; all other teams were greeted and informed of their placements by local representatives. Each leg's pit stop mat featured a localized design, while subsequent seasons have used a single design.

The Amazing Race was designed so that the final three teams would all reach the finish line. However, Joe & Bill were so far behind that they could not catch up and did not finish the competition. They were still completing Leg 12 in Alaska while Rob & Brennan and Frank & Margarita were crossing the finish line in New York City.

Cast
Eleven teams participated in the first season of The Amazing Race.

Future appearances
Kevin & Drew made an appearance in The Amazing Race: Family Edition, handing out clues from a hot dog stand in New York City. Kevin & Drew and Joe & Bill returned for the first All-Stars season. Frank Mesa made an appearance at the starting line of season 25. Rob & Brennan made an appearance at the starting line of season 27.

Results
The following teams are listed with their placements in each episode. Placements are listed in finishing order. 
A  placement with a dagger indicates that the team was eliminated. 
An  placement with a double-dagger indicates that the team was the last to arrive at a pit stop in a non-elimination leg. 
A  indicates that the team won the Fast Forward.

Notes

Race summary

Leg 1 (United States → South Africa → Zambia)

Episode 1: "The Race Begins" (September 5, 2001)
Eliminated: Matt & Ana
Locations
New York City, New York (Central Park – Bethesda Fountain) (Starting Line)
 New York City → Johannesburg, South Africa
Johannesburg (Lanseria Airport – Ryan Blake Air)
 Johannesburg → Livingstone, Zambia
Mosi-oa-Tunya National Park (Victoria Falls – Knife's Edge Bridge)
Mosi-oa-Tunya National Park (Victoria Falls – Boiling Pot) 
Livingstone District (Batoka Gorge – Abseil Zambia) 
Livingstone District (Songwe Village)  (Unaired) 
Episode summary
Teams set off from Bethesda Fountain in Central Park and traveled to John F. Kennedy International Airport, where they had to book one of three flights to Johannesburg, South Africa. The first was a direct South African Airways flight that arrived first, the second was a Swissair flight connecting in Zürich that arrived second, and the third was an Alitalia flight connecting in Milan that arrived last.
After arriving in Johannesburg, teams had to go directly to Lanseria Airport, where they had to book one of four charter flights to an unknown destination (Livingstone, Zambia). Once there, teams had to find a vehicle with their next clue, instructing them to find "the smoke that thunders", which they to figure out was the local name for Victoria Falls (Mosi-oa-Tunya). Teams could either drive themselves or hire a driver (who could not provide directions) to the falls in order to find their next clue.
 For the series' very first Fast Forward, one team had to hike down a steep canyon to the Boiling Pot on the Zambezi River. Rob & Brennan won the Fast Forward.
 The series' very first Detour was a choice between Air or Land. In Air, teams had to take a quick trip along a zip-line across Batoka Gorge and then experience a  gorge swing to reach the bottom in order to receive their next clue. In Land, teams would have had to take a long hike down the rim of the gorge in order to receive their next clue. All teams chose the zip-line.
Teams had to check in at the pit stop: Songwe Village.
Additional notes
 Near Songwe Village, there was a Roadblock that required one team member to cook an ostrich egg, which both team members had to eat, before they could check in at the pit stop. This task was unaired, but was shown as a bonus feature on the DVD.
The zip-line Detour at Batoka Gorge was later revisited in season 27 as a Switchback in Zimbabwe.

Leg 2 (Zambia → South Africa → France)

Episode 2: "Divide and Conquer" (September 19, 2001)
Eliminated: Kim & Leslie
Locations
Livingstone District (Songwe Village) 
Livingstone District (Songwe Museum)
Livingstone (Bundu Adventures) 
Southern Province (Mosi-oa-Tunya National Park) 
Livingstone District (Mukuni Village)
 Livingstone → Johannesburg, South Africa
 Johannesburg → Paris, France
Paris (Eiffel Tower) 
Paris (Arc de Triomphe) 
Episode summary
At the start of this leg, teams had to find the Songwe Museum located near the village, where they found instant cameras along with their next clue.
 For this leg's Fast Forward, one team had to whitewater raft down the treacherous rapids of the Zambezi River. Pat & Brenda won the Fast Forward.
 This leg's Detour was a choice between Near or Far. All teams chose to travel to the nearby park, so no teams actually traveled to Botswana.
After the Detour, teams had to travel to Mukuni Village, where they took part in a traditional welcome ceremony for honored guests. After the ceremony, teams gave the village chief the photographs they took during the Detour and received their next clue: a miniature model of the Eiffel Tower in Paris, France. Teams then returned by charter flight to Johannesburg, South Africa, where they had to book flights to Paris. Once in Paris, teams went directly to the Eiffel Tower.
 In this leg's Roadblock, one team member had to go by stairs to the second level of the Eiffel Tower and use a telescope to search the city's skyline for a famous monument with a Route Marker on top. The monument they had to spot was the Arc de Triomphe, which was the pit stop for this leg of the race.
Additional notes
This episode was originally scheduled to air on September 12, 2001, but was postponed due to the September 11 attacks.

Leg 3 (France)

Episode 3: "Home for Some" (September 26, 2001)
Eliminated: Pat & Brenda
Locations
Paris (Arc de Triomphe) 
Paris (Mariage Frères) 
Paris (Roue de Paris)
Paris (Notre-Dame de Paris  Panthéon) 
Paris (Hôtel de Ville) 
Paris (Place du Châtelet)
 Paris → Avignon  Marseille
Les Baux-de-Provence (Château des Baux) 
Episode summary
At the start of this leg, teams had to find "La Grande Roue" ("The Big Wheel") by figuring out that it was the nearby Roue de Paris in order to find their next clue.
 This leg's Fast Forward required one team to find a tea shop called Mariage Frères in the Rive Gauche and ask for a specific tea. Kevin & Drew won the Fast Forward.
 This leg's Detour was a choice between Tough Climb or Easy Walk. In Tough Climb, teams had to travel to Notre-Dame de Paris and climb the cathedral's north tower in order to ring Quasimodo's bell and receive their next clue. In Easy Walk, teams had to locate the statue of a cat sitting next to the Foucault pendulum in order to find their next clue. However, there were two Foucault pendulums in Paris, but only the one at the Panthéon had the statue of a cat, while the one at the Museum of Arts and Crafts did not.
After completing the Detour, teams had to find a man in a blue suit across from the Hôtel de Ville in order to receive their next clue.
 In this leg's Roadblock, one team member had to walk underground through the Paris sewers to the Place du Châtelet in order to find their next clue.
After completing the Roadblock, teams had to travel by train and taxi to Les Baux-de-Provence, and then by foot to the pit stop at the Château des Baux.

Leg 4 (France → Tunisia)

Episode 4: "Colossal Showdown" (October 3, 2001)
Eliminated: Dave & Margaretta
Locations
Les Baux-de-Provence (Château des Baux) 
 Marseille → Tunis, Tunisia
Tunis (Bab el Bhar)
Tunis (Medina of Tunis – Café Mnouchi  Hammam) 
El Djem (Amphitheatre of El Jem)  
Episode summary
At the start of this leg, teams were instructed to find a smaller version of the Arc de Triomphe in the country represented by a small flag. Teams had to figure out that they had a Tunisian flag, and they needed to travel by ferry from Marseille to Tunis, Tunisia. Once in Tunis, they had to find the man depicted in a provided photograph near the Bab el Bhar and say a traditional greeting of As-salām (السلام) in order to receive their next clue.
 This leg's Detour was a choice between Full Body Brew or Full Body Massage. In Full Body Brew, teams had to find the Café Mnouchi inside the Medina of Tunis using only a picture for reference. Once there, they had to order two coffees in order to receive their next clue. In Full Body Massage, teams had to search for a massage parlor marked on a provided map, and once there, they had to receive a 20-minute massage before they could receive their next clue. 
After completing the Detour, teams received a lighter marked with a picture of the amphitheatre in El Djem with the words "Go Here" on the back.
 In this leg's Roadblock, one team member had to light a torch and navigate the Amphitheatre of El Jem in order to find the pit of death. They then had to retrieve a sword above a pit, find their way out of the maze of tunnels, and bring it to the pit stop, where they sheathed the sword in order to finish the leg.

Leg 5 (Tunisia)

Episode 5: "Desert Storm" (October 10, 2001)
Eliminated: Paul & Amie
Locations
El Djem (Amphitheatre of El Jem) 
Tataouine (Monument to the Memory of the Earth)
Tataouine Governorate (Ksar Hadada) 
Jebil National Park (Ksar Ghilane – Camel Outpost) 
Jebil National Park (Ksar Ghilane – Oasis) 
Episode summary
At the start of this leg, teams received a photograph of a globe monument (the Monument to the Memory of the Earth) and instructions to travel to Tataouine in order to find their next clue. Along with their Detour clue, teams found cars that served as their transportation for the rest of the leg. They could hire a driver for US$50, but drivers could not provide directions, so all teams had to navigate using a simple provided map.
 This leg's Detour was a choice between Listening or Puzzling. In Listening, teams had to find the Star Wars movie set (Ksar Hadada) and use a supplied walkie-talkie and their sense of hearing in order to locate the radio's counterpart hidden somewhere in the labyrinth of caves with their next clue. In Puzzling, teams would have had to find Ksar Ouled Soltane, a hard-to-find location, and solve a simple Tunisian dice game in order to receive their next clue. All teams chose the walkie-talkie task.
 In this leg's Roadblock, one team member had to ride a camel and use a set of compass directions to reach the flag visible in the distance in the middle of the desert. The non-participating member had to trek alongside on foot. Once they reached the route marker, teams found a new set of compass directions to the next pit stop: the Ksar Ghilane oasis.

Leg 6 (Tunisia → Italy)

Episode 6: "Whatever It Takes to Win" (October 17, 2001)
Locations
Gabès (Streets of Gabès) 
La Marsa (Hôtel Le Palace)
 Tunis → Rome, Italy
Rome (Colosseum)
Rome (Palazzo dei Conservatori  Monumento Nazionale a Vittorio Emanuele II) 
 Rome → Castelfranco Emilia
San Cesario sul Panaro (Pagani Auto Factory) 
Sant'Agata Bolognese (Town Square) 
Episode summary
During the pit stop, a sandstorm in the Sahara forced the teams to move as a safety precaution to Gabès to start the leg.
At the start of this leg, teams had to travel to the Hôtel Le Palace near Tunis in order to find their next clue, which instructed them to fly to Rome, Italy. Once in Rome, teams found their next clue outside the Colosseum.
 This leg's Detour was a choice between Foot or Hoof. In Foot, teams had to find a well-known statue of a foot at the Palazzo dei Conservatori, using a provided picture that contained the entire statue, in order to find their next clue. In Hoof, teams were given a partial picture of a more obscure statue depicting the hoof of the equestrian statue of Vittorio Emanuele II. If teams completed this task, they found a line of taxis waiting for them. 
After completing the Detour, teams had to travel by train to Castelfranco Emilia and then take a taxi to the Pagani Auto Factory in order to find their next clue.
 In this leg's Roadblock, one team member had to drive a Smart car to the town square of Sant'Agata Bolognese using a map written entirely in Italian.
Once team members were reunited, they could check in at the pit stop in the town square.
Additional notes
Due to an airport strike in Rome, all flights to Rome were either fully booked or cancelled. As a result, teams had the option of either flying to elsewhere in Europe and taking a connecting flight or train to Rome or risk waiting in Tunis until direct evening flights to Rome might become available.
This was a non-elimination leg.

Leg 7 (Italy → India)

Episode 7: "Triumph and Loss" (October 24, 2001)
Eliminated: Lenny & Karyn
Locations
Sant'Agata Bolognese (Town Square) 
Ferrara (Castello Estense) 
Ferrara (Aeroclub Volovelistico Ferrarese  Bike Shop) 
 Ferrara → Rome  Milan
 Rome  Milan → Delhi, India
Delhi (Red Fort)
 Delhi (Chandni Chowk) 
Agra (Taj Khema Hotel) 
Episode summary 
 This leg's Detour was a choice between Glide or Ride. In Glide, teams traveled to the town of Ferrara, where one team member rode in a glider with a professional glider pilot while their partner rode in the towing plane. Once completed, the team received a free taxi ride to the Ferrara railway station, where they found their next clue. In Ride, teams had to travel to a bicycle shop in Ferrara and then ride  to the Ferrara railway station following a street map in order to retrieve their next clue. 
 This leg's Fast Forward required one team to find Castello Estense in the town of Ferrara and row a boat around the castle's moat to find the Fast Forward award hidden in the wall. Frank & Margarita won the Fast Forward.
After completing the Detour, teams were instructed to fly to Delhi, India, by catching a train to either Rome or Milan, from which they could fly to Delhi. Once in Delhi, teams found their next clue outside the Red Fort.
 In this leg's Roadblock, one team member had to hire a cycle rickshaw and find a specific shopkeeper in the congested Chandni Chowk market, who showed the team member a blue box containing a replica of the Taj Mahal along with their next clue.
Teams had to check in at the pit stop: the Taj Khema Hotel in Agra.

Leg 8 (India)

Episode 8: "Competition to the Fullest" (October 31, 2001)
Locations
Agra (Taj Khema Hotel) 
Agra (Taj Mahal)
Jaipur (Palace of the Winds)
Jaipur (Amber Fort  Jal Mahal) 
 Jaipur → Bikaner
Deshnoke (Karni Mata Temple) 
Bikaner (Laxmi Niwas Palace) 
Episode summary
At the beginning of this leg, teams had to search the grounds of the Taj Mahal for their next clue, which instructed them to travel to the Palace of the Winds in Jaipur.
 This leg's Detour was a choice between Elephant or Rowboat. In Elephant, teams had to ride an elephant up a steep path to the Amber Fort and then find a holy man who had their next clue. In Rowboat, teams had to reach the Jal Mahal water palace using a rowboat and then find a holy man who had their next clue. 
After completing the Detour, teams were instructed to travel by train to Bikaner.
 In this leg's Roadblock, one team member had to find a canister containing their next clue somewhere in the Karni Mata Temple, a temple devoted to the worship of rats. 
Teams had to check in at the pit stop: the Laxmi Niwas Palace in Bikaner.
Additional notes
This was a non-elimination leg.

Leg 9 (India → Thailand)

Episode 9: "The Unexpected Twist" (November 14, 2001)
Eliminated: Nancy & Emily
Locations
Bikaner (Laxmi Niwas Palace) 
   Bikaner → Delhi
 Delhi → Bangkok, Thailand
Bangkok (Temple of the Reclining Buddha) 
Bangkok (Temple of Dawn)
Bangkok (Southern Bus Terminal  Bangkok Yai) 
Kanchanaburi (Buddhist Monastery) 
Krabi (Tiger Cave Temple) 
Episode summary
At the beginning of this leg, teams were instructed to take either a bus or train back to Delhi and then fly to Bangkok, Thailand. Once in Bangkok, teams had to make their way to the Temple of Dawn in order to find their next clue.
 This season's final Fast Forward required teams to travel to the Temple of the Reclining Buddha and play a traditional Buddhist game using the 108 urns alongside the giant reclining Buddha. They had to choose a bowl of coins and drop exactly one coin in every urn. If the bowl that the teams chose had too few or too many coins, they had to choose another bowl and try again. The first team to find the bowl with exactly 108 coins would win the Fast Forward. Joe & Bill defeated Nancy & Emily and won the Fast Forward.
 This leg's Detour was a choice between Public or Private. Both tasks required teams to find transportation to Kanchanaburi. In Public, teams had to go to a local bus station and ride a public bus which left every 20 minutes, paying with their own money. In Private, teams had to find a specified private vehicle, using only a license plate number and a crude map of the nearby area, which would give them a free ride to Kanchanaburi. 
 In this leg's Roadblock, one team member had to dress like a Buddhist monk and walk through a pit of tigers in order to retrieve their next clue.
Teams had to check in at the pit stop: the Tiger Cave Temple in Krabi.
Additional notes
Nancy & Emily became frustrated after spending hours searching fruitlessly for the private vehicle, so they took a taxi to Kanchanaburi instead of completing the Detour, for which they incurred a 24-hour penalty and were thus eliminated from the race.

Leg 10 (Thailand)

Episode 10: "To the Physical and Mental Limit" (November 21, 2001)
Locations
Krabi (Tiger Cave Temple) 
Ao Phang Nga National Park (Railay Beach – King Climbers)
Ao Phang Nga National Park (Thaiwand Wall) 
 Ao Phang Nga National Park (Thaiwand Wall → Railay Beach)
 Ao Phang Nga National Park (Railay Beach) → Ao Nang (Ao Nang Beach)
Bor Tor (Sea, Land & Trek) 
 Ao Nang (Ao Nang Beach) → Ao Phang Nga National Park (Chicken Island)
 Ao Nang (Pai Plong Beach) 
Episode summary
At the beginning of this leg, teams were instructed to find "The King" at Railay Beach – the King Climbers rock climbing school – where they received rock-climbing equipment and then hiked a half-mile through the jungle to reach Thaiwand Wall and their next clue.
 This leg's Detour was a choice between Hike or Climb. In Hike, teams would have had to travel on a long, winding path up Thaiwand Wall in order to find their next clue. In Climb, teams had to take an arduous rock climb straight up Thaiwand Wall in order to find their next clue. All teams chose the rock climb.
After the Detour, teams had to rappel into a boat that brought them back to Railay Beach, where they then proceeded to Sea, Land & Trek rafting company in Bor Tor in order to find their next clue.
 In this leg's Roadblock, one team member had to paddle a kayak with their team member down the river in search of a route marker flag. Once spotted, they had to climb into a nearby cave, Tham Hua Kalok, in order to find their next clue along with snorkeling gear. 
After completing the Roadblock, teams had to paddle back to Sea, Land & Trek. Teams then had to hire a boat at Ao Nang Beach and find a route marker bobbing in the water  from the mainland near Chicken Island, where they had to use their snorkeling gear to dive in the water and retrieve their next clue.
Teams had to check in at the pit stop: Pai Plong Beach in Ao Nang.
Additional notes
This was a non-elimination leg.

Leg 11 (Thailand → China)

Episode 11: "Fight to the Last Minute" (November 28, 2001)
Eliminated: Kevin & Drew
Locations
Ao Nang (Pai Plong Beach) 
 Phuket → Beijing, China
Beijing (Jingshan Park – Top Pavilion) 
Beijing (Hongqiao Market )
Beijing (Donghuamen Night Market) 
Beijing (Tiantan Park) 
Episode summary
At the beginning of this leg, teams were instructed to fly to Beijing, China. Once in Beijing, teams found their next clue at Jingshan Park.
 This leg's Detour was a choice between Volley or Rally. In Volley, teams had to score five points in a game of ping-pong against a local champion at a nearby community center in order to receive their next clue. In Rally, teams had to travel by three common forms of local transportation: a bus to Hu Jia Lou, a motorcycle taxi to Liu Jia Yao, and a pedicab to Quan Xin Yuan Restaurant, where they found their next clue. 
At the Hongqiao Market, teams received a shopping list written almost entirely in Mandarin Chinese that they had to use to purchase five beetle larvae, one squid, and two chicken feet. Teams then traveled to the Donghuamen Night Market in order to find their next clue.
 In this leg's Roadblock, one team member had to give the items they'd just bought to a chef at the market for him to cook. They then had to eat all three dishes in order to receive their next clue.
Teams hadto check in at the pit stop: the South Gate of Tiantan Park in Beijing.
Additional notes
Frank & Margarita and Rob & Brennan caught a much earlier flight to Beijing than Joe & Bill and Kevin & Drew. As a result, Joe & Bill and Kevin & Drew were almost a full day behind the other teams when they arrived in Beijing. Joe & Bill would remain almost a full day behind the remaining two teams for the rest of the race.

Leg 12 (China → United States)

Episode 12: "Race to the Finish — Part 1" (December 5, 2001)
Locations
Beijing (Tiantan Park) 
 Beijing (Great Wall of China – Jūyōng Pass) 
 Beijing → Anchorage, Alaska
Scotty Lake (North Country Bed and Breakfast)
Scotty Lake (Blanket Toss Area)
Glacier View (Matanuska Glacier) 
Trapper Creek (Highway Mile Marker 131)
Trapper Creek (Wilderness Cabin) 
Episode summary
At the beginning of this leg, teams had to use a map to find three kite flyers in Tiantan Park with their next clue attached to the kites. Teams were then instructed to travel to the Great Wall of China by public bus in order to find their next clue.
 This leg's Detour at the Great Wall of China was a choice between Flat or Steep. In Flat, teams had to walk along a long, flat path to a faraway pavilion with their next clue. In Steep, teams had to hike up a much shorter, but extremely steep, path to a closer pavilion with their next clue. All teams chose the steep hike.
Teams were instructed to fly to Anchorage, Alaska. Once in Anchorage, teams chose a marked 4x4 and were driven to North Country Bed and Breakfast in Scotty Lake, where they spent the night. The next morning, one team member had to experience an Alaskan blanket toss known as Nalukataq in order to spot a nearby route marker on the ice.
 In this leg's Roadblock, one team member had to climb an ice wall in order to retrieve their next clue from the top of the glacier. 
After completing the Roadblock, teams had to reach highway Mile Marker 131 near Denali State Park, where they left their vehicles and rode snowmobiles to the pit stop at a wilderness cabin.
Additional notes
This was a non-elimination leg.

Leg 13 (United States)

Episode 13: "Race to the Finish — Part 2" (December 13, 2001)
Winners: Rob & Brennan
Second Place: Frank & Margarita
Third Place: Joe & Bill
Locations
Trapper Creek (Wilderness Cabin) 
Trapper Creek (Takosha Lodge) 
Talkeetna (Fish Lake) 
 Anchorage → Newark, New Jersey
New York City, New York (Vincent Daniels Square)
 New York City (52nd Street–Lincoln Avenue Station → Willets Point–Shea Stadium Station)
New York City (Flushing Meadows Park – Unisphere) 
Episode summary
At the start of this leg, teams donned snowshoes and followed flags  to Takosha Lodge in order to find their next clue.
 This season's final Detour was a choice between Dog Power or Horsepower. In Dog Power, teams had to ride dogsleds  to their next clue. In Horsepower, teams would have had to ride snowmobiles  to their next clue. Both teams chose to ride the dog sleds.
Teams were instructed to fly to New York City. Once there, teams had to travel by taxi to Vincent Daniels Square along 51st and Roosevelt Avenue in Queens in order to find their final clue.
At Vincent Daniels Square, teams had to take the 7 train from an adjacent elevated station to the Willets Point–Shea Stadium Station, and then follow the flags to the finish line at Flushing Meadows Park.
Additional notes
Joe & Bill had fallen so far behind the other two teams that by the time they began the leg in Alaska, Rob & Brennan and Frank & Margarita were already crossing the finish line in New York. Instead of receiving the next clue, Joe & Bill received notice that the race had ended when they opened their clue envelope at the Takosha Lodge.

Reception
Season 1 was not particularly a ratings success as the series premiered six days prior to the September 11 attacks, after which interest in foreign travel waned and viewership fell correspondingly. The show was further hindered by the lack of media coverage and promotion as networks focused on news stories and more patriotic programming. Additionally, the show premiered and competed in the same time slot as with NBC's short-lived Lost, another travel reality game show with a similar premise. The show did just well enough to earn a second season, which aired the following spring.

Critical response
Despite the lower than expected ratings, The Amazing Race 1 received positive reviews. Linda Holmes of Television Without Pity wrote that she "was flat-out hooked for thirteen weeks, and the ending managed not to disappoint, which almost never happens." Matt Roush of TV Guide called this season "TV's best reality show". Allan Johnson of the Chicago Tribune called the first season "a satisfying race around the world". In 2016, this season was ranked 5th out of the first 27 seasons by the Rob Has a Podcast Amazing Race correspondents. Kareem Gantt of Screen Rant wrote that this season "had a great cast, truly awesome locations, and challenges that kept the viewer on the edge". In 2021, Jane Andrews of Gossip Cop ranked this season as the fourth best. In 2022, Jason Shomer of Collider ranked this season among the show's top seven seasons. In 2022, Rhenn Taguiam of Game Rant ranked this season as the overall best season.

Distribution
The DVD boxed set for Season 1 was released on September 27, 2005. Kevin & Drew, Lenny & Karyn, Joe & Bill, and Rob & Brennan did commentary on four episodes.

Ratings
U.S. Nielsen ratings

References

The Amazing Race: The First Season. CBS. DVD. Paramount, 2005.

External links
Archived copy of Official CBS season 1 website

 01
2001 American television seasons
Impact of the September 11 attacks on television
Television shows filmed in New York City
Television shows filmed in South Africa
Television shows filmed in Zambia
Television shows filmed in Botswana
Television shows filmed in France
Television shows filmed in Tunisia
Television shows filmed in Switzerland
Television shows filmed in Italy
Television shows filmed in Denmark
Television shows filmed in India
Television shows filmed in Thailand
Television shows filmed in Beijing
Television shows filmed in Alaska
Television shows filmed in Washington (state)
Television shows filmed in New Jersey